Chance of a Ghost is a 1958 Australian television play directed by Royston Morley and written by James Carhartt based on a play by Carhartt and Nicholas Winter.  It was based on a radio play. Australian TV drama was relatively rare at the time.

Plot
On New Year's Eve, a party of Americans have a celebrations at a penthouse where 20 years before a musical comedy star had been killed. One member of the party, Serena, becomes interested in the story. She becomes so obsessed she is "possessed" by the spirit of the dead woman and begins to look and behave like her.

Cast
Bert Bertram as Friend
Jacqueline Knott as Serena
Moray Powell
Walter Sullivan

Production
The idea for the plot came from a murder committed at the Medical Arts Building in New York. "For years afterwards no one would rent the place and it became known as the haunted penthouse," said James Carhartt who turned it into a play with Nicholas Winter. Carhartt was an American who moved to Sydney and he adapted the play for Australian television.

See also
List of live television plays broadcast on Australian Broadcasting Corporation (1950s)

References

External links

1950s Australian television plays
1958 television plays